Nathaniel Hazard (1776 – December 17, 1820) was a U.S. Representative from Rhode Island.

Born in Newport, Rhode Island, Hazard was graduated from Brown University in 1792.
He served as a member of the Rhode Island House of Representatives and served as speaker.

Hazard was elected as a Republican to the Sixteenth Congress and served from March 4, 1819, until his death in Washington, D.C., on December 17, 1820. He was interred in the Congressional Cemetery.

Nathaniel wrote to Alexander Hamilton on a few occasions in New York where he brings to Hamilton’s attention of the cities problems and concerns.

See also

List of United States Congress members who died in office (1790–1899)

Sources

Founders Online
Biographical Directory of The United States Congress

External links

1776 births
1820 deaths
Brown University alumni
Burials at the Congressional Cemetery
Democratic-Republican Party members of the United States House of Representatives from Rhode Island
Speakers of the Rhode Island House of Representatives
Republican Party members of the Rhode Island House of Representatives
Hazard family of Rhode Island